Sir Charles Davers, 6th Baronet (4 June 1737 – 4 June 1806) was a British Army officer and politician who sat in the House of Commons from 1768 to 1802.

Early life and military career
Davers was the second surviving son of Sir Jermyn Davers, 4th Baronet, MP and Margaretta Green. He was brought up at Rushbrooke Hall in Suffolk and educated at King Edward VI School (Bury St Edmunds) and Trinity College, Cambridge, where he graduated in 1755. He then undertook the Grand Tour.

Davers became an officer in the British Army in 1758, being commissioned into the 44th (East Essex) Regiment of Foot. He served in North America during the Seven Years' War. In January 1761 he was promoted to the rank of Captain while in the service of the 99th Regiment of Foot. He was garrisoned in Ireland in 1766 and was promoted to Major.

Political career
In 1763 Davers inherited his brother's Baronetcy and estates.  In the 1768 general election he was elected as the Member of Parliament for Weymouth. At the   1774 general election he was returned as MP for Bury St Edmunds. Davers held his seat in the House of Commons due to his close personal alliance with Augustus FitzRoy, 3rd Duke of Grafton. Grafton encouraged him to cultivate his family interest in Bury at the expense of Davers' brother-in-law, Frederick Hervey, 4th Earl of Bristol. Davers publicly aligned himself against William Pitt the Younger, but did not become a Whig and retained his independence.

Personal life
Davers lived at Rushbrooke Hall with Frances Treice, by whom he had five illegitimate sons and three illegitimate daughters. He was rumoured to have earlier married Miss Coutts, a planter's daughter, in America while serving in the army, and to have had a son, Rushbrook.

On his death in 1806 he was buried at St Nicholas Church, Rushbrooke. He left his estates to his nephew, Frederick Hervey, 1st Marquess of Bristol, and his baronetcy became extinct.

References

1737 births
1806 deaths
Politicians from Bury St Edmunds
People educated at King Edward VI School, Bury St Edmunds
Alumni of Trinity College, Cambridge
English landowners
18th-century English people
44th Regiment of Foot officers
Baronets in the Baronetage of England
British Army personnel of the Seven Years' War
Members of the Parliament of Great Britain for English constituencies
Members of the Parliament of the United Kingdom for English constituencies
British MPs 1768–1774
British MPs 1774–1780
British MPs 1780–1784
British MPs 1784–1790
British MPs 1790–1796
British MPs 1796–1800
UK MPs 1801–1802